Nyangwe is a town in Kasongo, Maniema on the right bank of the Lualaba in the Democratic Republic of Congo (territory of Kasongo). It was an important hub for the Arabs for trade goods like ivory, gold, iron & slaves: it was one of the main slave trading states in the region at the end of the 19th century.

The town was founded around 1860, and a first Sultan named Dougombi (métis) established in 1868. Ramazani Munia Muhara (Manyema) was the Sultan the town by the time of the Congo-Arab war during 1892–1894 in Kasongo, Maniema

It is believed the first contact with WaSwahili traders from Zanzibar (from the Monarchy of Zanzibar descended from Omani Empire) in Nyangwe dates back to the Abbasid expeditions to East Africa where it is reputed that Abbasid Caliphs sent punitive expeditions to the Islamized city-states of the Somali coast and Zanzibar set up governors there where Abbasid victory saw the both:

 the impositon of the kharāj
 acceptance of the doctrine of the createdness of the Quran

by 837 CE

Indeed, the 9th-century writer al-Jāḥiẓ records an Omani expedition to East Africa in the late 7th century, but it was defeated.

The sultans of Mogadishu, Mārka, Barāwa, Faza, Sīwī, Bata, Manda (Munda), Ṭaqa, Lamu (Āmu), Ūzi, Malindi(Malūdi), Uyūmba, Kilifi, Basāsa, Zanzibar, Kilwa and Waybu (possibly a tributary of the Shebelle) are among those who accepted the emissary. Gervase Mathew dates this to 766–767 and considers it a military expedition.

Nyangwe and the greater part of Kasongo, Maniema later became the capital of the Sultanate of Utetera (under the control of the Sultanate of Zanzibar) descended from the Monarchy of Zanzibar between 1696 and 1890 CE and thus, an offshoot of the Omani Monarchy before the death of Said bin Sultan in 1856 when the empire was divided between his sons into two sultanates: an African section called the Sultanate of Zanzibar through Majid bin Said and an Asian section called the Sultanate of Muscat and Oman ruled by Thuwaini bin Said.

It is believed it was established after the Arabs drove out the original inhabitants in and around the village. As a result, the original inhabitants of the place called the Wagenya had become distrustful of any foreigners visiting the region.

David Livingstone was the first European to visit the town in 1871. Livingstone stated that on July 15, 1871, and he witnessed approximately 400 Africans massacred by three Arabs who worked for Livingstone's associate, the Arab ruler and slave trader Dugumbe. The cause behind this attack is stated to be retaliation for actions of Manilla, the head slave who had sacked villages of Mohombo people at the instigation of the Wagenya chieftain Kimburu. The Arabs attacked the shoppers and Kimburu's people.

Researchers who scanned Livingstone's diary stated that he feared that his own men might have been involved in it.

The account describing the massacre was changed in the "Last Journals" published in 1874. While his published journal blamed Dugumbe's men, it is Manilla who seems to be leading the raid and breaking the treaty with Kimburu according to the researchers who decoded his diary. In the diary, he states that he had sent the Banian slaves, liberated slaves who were sent to him by John Kirk, to assist Manilla's brother which may indicate their role in the attack. In addition, the field diary doesn't contain any record of Livingstone refuting the Muslims who accused the English of the massacre. In the published journal however, the events are changed and much of the reprobate behaviour of Banian slaves mentioned by Livingstone is omitted.

It was the last known town for people coming from the East, and Livingstone thought that the Lualaba was the high part of the Nile River.

Verney Lovett Cameron visited the town in 1874. In 1877 Henry Morton Stanley followed the river downstream from Nyangwe with local reigning Tippu Tip, and as he arrived in Boma, he established that this was the Congo River.

Hermann von Wissmann visited Nyangwe in 1883.

Notes

Populated places established in 1860
Populated places in Maniema
Lualaba River